Camilla Borsotti (born 1988) is an Italian alpine skier.

Biography
She won the silver medal in the super-G at the 2006 World Junior Championships, and also competed at the 2005 and 2007 World Junior Championships

She made her World Cup debut in December 2005 in Lienz, not managing to finish the race. She collected her first World Cup points with a 27th place in the December 2006 super combined at Reiteralm, and in the same discipline she broke the top-10 barrier when finishing 7th in December 2007 in St. Anton. Equalling this placement in March 2011 in Tarvisio, it remained her career best.

She represented the sports club C.S. Carabinieri.

References

External links
 

1988 births
Living people
Italian female alpine skiers
Alpine skiers of Centro Sportivo Carabinieri
People from Lanzo Torinese
Sportspeople from the Metropolitan City of Turin